Hemiblossia is a genus of daesiid camel spiders, first described by Karl Kraepelin in 1899.

Species 
, the World Solifugae Catalog accepts the following eighteen species:

 Hemiblossia australis (Purcell, 1902) — Namibia, South Africa, Zimbabwe
 Hemiblossia bouvieri Kraepelin, 1899 — Angola, Kenya, Namibia, South Africa, Zambia, Zimbabwe
 Hemiblossia brunnea Lawrence, 1953 — Kenya
 Hemiblossia etosha Lawrence, 1927 — Namibia
 Hemiblossia evangelina Lawrence, 1968 — South Africa
 Hemiblossia idioceras Hewitt, 1917 — Namibia, South Africa
 Hemiblossia kalaharica Kraepelin, 1908 — Botswana
 Hemiblossia lawrencei Roewer, 1933 — Namibia
 Hemiblossia machadoi Lawrence, 1960 — Angola
 Hemiblossia michaelseni Roewer, 1933 — Namibia
 Hemiblossia monocerus Hewitt, 1927 — Zimbabwe
 Hemiblossia nama Lawrence, 1968 — South Africa
 Hemiblossia nigritarsis Lawrence, 1960 — Angola, Namibia
 Hemiblossia oneili Purcell, 1902 — Namibia, South Africa
 Hemiblossia robusta Lawrence, 1972 — Namibia
 Hemiblossia rubropurpurea Lawrence, 1955 — Namibia, Zimbabwe
 Hemiblossia tana (Roewer, 1933) — Ethiopia
 Hemiblossia termitophila Lawrence, 1965 — Namibia, South Africa

References 

Arachnid genera
Solifugae